Claude Dulong-Sainteny or Marguerite-Claude Badalo-Dulong or Claude Dulong (12 June 1922 in Limoges – 29 October 2017 in Paris) was a French historian.

Biography 

Graduate of the École Nationale des Chartes in 1945, then graduate in literature, she became librarian in particular in the Versailles classified municipal library.

She first became interested in the Middle Ages, her research focused thereafter on the 17th century.

She married Jean Sainteny and circulated among the gaulliste political circles.

In 1953, she took part in a seminar organized in Harvard by Henry Kissinger. This participation with Jean Sainteny provided a link between the American government and Ho Chi Minh for secret negotiations.
 
In 1995, she was elected in the Académie des sciences morales et politiques, in place of Jean Laloy.

Claude Dulong has also held positions at the United Nations Educational, Scientific, and Cultural Organisation (UNESCO) and at the Alliance Française.

Bibliography

Distinctions  
  Officer of the Legion of Honour
  Officer of the Ordre des Arts et des Lettres

Notes & references 

1922 births
2017 deaths
20th-century French historians
People from Limoges
French women historians